CUMYL-CBMINACA (SGT-277) is an indazole-3-carboxamide based synthetic cannabinoid receptor agonist that has been sold as a designer drug, first being identified in Germany in February 2020. It is illegal in Finland.

See also 
 CUMYL-CBMICA
 CUMYL-CH-MEGACLONE
 CUMYL-CHMICA
 CUMYL-THPINACA

References 

Cannabinoids
Designer drugs